Ransbach may refer to:
 Ransbach-Baumbach, a town in the Westerwaldkreis in Rhineland-Palatinate, Germany
 Ransbach-Baumbach (Verbandsgemeinde), a "collective municipality" in the district Westerwaldkreis in Rhineland-Palatinate, Germany
 Ransbach (Hohenroda), a village and a municipal district of Hohenroda in Hersfeld-Rotenburg district in eastern Hesse, Germany
 Ransbach (Lauer), a river of Bavaria, Germany, tributary of the Lauer